Rando may refer to:
a short Germanic name, from names beginning with the element rand "shield"
Rando (king), 4th century king of the Alemanni 
 Rando Ayamine (born 1974), manga artist
 Rando (YuYu Hakusho), a fictional character from the anime and manga series YuYu Hakusho
Rando (dog), or Koton, dog featuring in the film K-9

See also